Hope Springs is a British television comedy-drama series following the lives of four female ex-cons in hiding following a multimillion-pound robbery. Produced by Shed Productions, the company behind Bad Girls, Footballers' Wives, and Waterloo Road, the 8-part series began airing on BBC One on 7 June 2009  and finished on 26 July 2009. After a single series, the BBC cancelled Hope Springs, because it "did not find its audience in the way that [they] had hoped."

Filming 
Production on the series began in summer 2008  in the village of Wanlockhead, situated in the Dumfries and Galloway region, an ideal location chosen for its beautiful and  tranquil scenery to provide the perfect backdrop for the programme. The interior scenes to be featured have been shot at the BBC Scotland drama studios in Dumbarton.

Cast

Plot 
The 8-part first series is set around the lives of Ellie Langden (Alex Kingston), Hannah Temple (Siân Reeves), Shoo Coggan (Christine Bottomley) and Josie Porritt (Vinette Robinson) – four sexy female ex-cons attempting to go straight. With the help of £3 million, stolen from Ellie's rich gangster husband Roy (Mark Frost), they plan to head out to the sunny safety of Barbados to begin their new lives. However, when their long-thought-out plan goes wrong, they find themselves staying in the remote Scottish village of Hope Springs – a village set to change each of their lives forever.

The series ended with the text:

Episodes

Ratings

DVD release 
The 3-disc DVD box set of Hope Springs was released in the UK on 27 July 2009, distributed by Acorn Media UK.

References

Further reading
Park, Brian (13 May 2009). "TX: Hope Springs". Broadcastnow (Emap Media). Retrieved 15 May 2009.

External links

 Shed Media. Official Shed Site.
 Hope Springs at the British Comedy Guide
 
 
 Shed Insider, fan-site of Shed Media' programs.

2009 British television series debuts
2009 British television series endings
BBC Scotland television shows
Television shows set in Scotland
Fictional populated places in Scotland
English-language television shows
Wanlockhead